The McKee Mk.6 is a special purpose-built American sports prototype race car, designed, developed, and built by Bob McKee, in 1966. It competed in both the United States Road Racing Championship, and the Can-Am series. It achieved a total of 2 wins and 5 podium finishes. Career highlights for it include wins at both Road America and Riverside in 1966, a fourth-place finish at Las Vegas in 1966, and another podium finish at Watkins Glen that same year. It was powered by numerous engines, including Chevrolet, Ford, and Oldsmobile motors.

References

Sports racing cars
1960s cars
Cars of the United States
Can-Am cars